Aiguaviva is a village in the province of Girona and autonomous community of Catalonia, Spain.

Population

Places of interest
 Església de Sant Joan (St. John's Church), Gothic style with neoclassical elements.
 St. Mary of Vilademany Chapel, Romanesque style.
 House of the Templars.

Economy
The economy is focused primarily on dryland agriculture and livestock. Formerly there were several tile factories but currently these have disappeared.

References

External links
 City Council website
 Government data pages 

Municipalities in Gironès
Populated places in Gironès